Fan is a 2016 Indian Hindi-language action thriller film
directed by Maneesh Sharma and co-written by Sharma and Habib Faisal. Produced by Aditya Chopra, the film stars Shah Rukh Khan in a dual role as filmstar Aryan Khanna and his obsessive fan Gaurav Chandna, who looks just like him. Gaurav beats up a rival actor to appease Aryan, but is instead punished by his idol; heartbroken, the fan plans revenge.

Sharma had originally conceived the idea of Fan in 2006 and recited the story to Chopra, who advised him against the challenging project for his directorial debut. In the same year, Yash Chopra read it to Khan, who expressed interest in being part of the project. The project was revived in late 2013, and Khan underwent 3D scanning in 2014. Principal photography began in July 2014 and was completed by November 2015. Fan was a songless film; a soundtrack album consisting of a marketing song in different languages was composed by Vishal–Shekhar and the original score was done by Andrea Guerra.

Fan was heavily marketed; after several delays, it was released internationally on 15 April 2016. The film opened to positive reviews from critics, who praised Khan's performance, visual effects and action sequences, with criticism focused on the editing and the loosely written script. The film collected 1.2 billion in India and 679 million from overseas territories, for a total of 1.88 billion against a production budget of 1.20 billion. At the 63rd Filmfare Awards, Fan received the Filmfare Award for Best Special Effects. The film was commercially unsuccessful at the Indian Box office, but managed to succeed at the overseas box office.

Plot 
Gaurav Chandna is a Delhi-based hardcore and obsessive fan of Bollywood superstar Aryan Khanna. He harbours a crush on Neha, his friend and neighbour who works at a call centre. Gaurav's face bears an uncanny similarity to Aryan's, which helps him win the local talent show by impersonating Aryan. Encouraged by his parents, he embarks on a train journey to Mumbai to meet Aryan and present him with the trophy won by impersonating him.

When Sid Kapoor, a fellow actor, expresses harsh sentiments about Aryan to the press, an infuriated Gaurav beats him and makes him apologise to Aryan while he records it. The video is uploaded to the Internet, where Aryan sees it and has Gaurav arrested. Gaurav is mercilessly beaten in jail, where Aryan angrily reprimands him, declaring that Gaurav is not his fan and that he had Gaurav arrested. Gaurav asks for five minutes of Aryan's time, at which Aryan scoffs at giving the fan even five seconds. Devastated, Gaurav returns home and burns all of his Aryan memorabilia, vowing revenge against Aryan for turning away his fan.

A year later in London, Gaurav goes to Madame Tussauds, impersonating Aryan and purposely creating havoc which leads to Aryan being arrested by police. Released on bail, Aryan receives a call from Gaurav, who reveals what he did and offers to stop troubling Aryan if he will apologise. Aryan refuses, and Gaurav disguises himself as a crew-member on Aryan's show.

Aryan is scheduled to perform at the wedding of a billionaire's daughter in Dubrovnik, Croatia. After performing a dance show, Aryan receives a card with the message "Say sorry", and realises that Gaurav is nearby. Meanwhile, Gaurav poses as Aryan and molests one of the lady guests. The billionaire berates the real Aryan and makes him leave the event. Outside, Aryan spots Gaurav and chases him, though Gaurav escapes. The molestation incident is reported by the media, resulting in a tarnished reputation and boycotts of Aryan's shows.

Gaurav invades Aryan's home in India and vandalizes his trophy collection, even frightening his wife Bela and Aryan's children. Aryan visits Gaurav's parents and meets Neha, Gaurav's neighbour and crush. With their help, Aryan impersonates Gaurav at the local talent show; he declares Gaurav's love to Neha and tells about Gaurav's acts, to the ire of the audience. This provokes Gaurav, who shoots at Aryan with a gun. Aryan chases Gaurav and subdues him after a bloody fight. Aryan asks Gaurav to give up impersonating him and live a normal life. Gaurav responds by telling Aryan that he has destroyed his life and reminds him that he has not apologised yet. Gaurav flings himself off the roof, dying with a smile.

Aryan's name is cleared from all the controversies, but the ordeal haunts him, and his name is linked with Gaurav's both in his mind and in the eyes of the public. On his next birthday, Aryan goes out to the roof to greet his fans. When he is about to turn, he sees a haunting glimpse of Gaurav in the crowd, smiling up at him, upon which he turns back to the crowd with greater respect and appreciation.

Cast 
The cast is listed below.
 Shah Rukh Khan in a dual role as 
Aryan Khanna (Bollywood superstar), the main protagonist
Gaurav Chandna (Fan turned enemy of Aryan), the main antagonist
 Sayani Gupta as Sunaina (Aryan's manager)
 Shriya Pilgaonkar as Neha Singh (Gaurav's crush)
 Waluscha De Sousa as Bella Khanna (Aryan's wife)
 Yogendra Tikku as Mr. Chandna (Gaurav's father)
 Deepika Amin as Mrs. Chandna (Gaurav's mother)
 Taher Shabbir as Sid Kapoor (an actor)
 Parveen Kaur as Aunty (Train passenger)
 Megha Gupta as Payal
 Amarjeet Singh as a Show Host
 Shikha Malhotra as TV News Anchor
 Mohit Bagri as Dhruv Khanna (Aryan & Bella's son)
 Namit as Mr. Bhutiani
 Bianca Colaco as Ishaa Khanna (Aryan & Bella's daughter)
 Indraneel Bhattacharya as Akhtar (Aryan's lawyer)
 Prashant Walde

Production

Development and casting 
After serving as an assistant director in the Yash Raj Films productions Fanaa and Aaj Nachle, Maneesh Sharma read the story of Fan to Aditya Chopra in 2006. Chopra felt that the film was too ambitious and expensive for a debut and advised him to abandon the idea, after which Sharma took up Band Baaja Baaraat. Yash Chopra brought the story to Shah Rukh Khan in 2006, and Khan was interested in the project. The idea of Fan came from Sharma's observation of the desires and expectations of fans upon the celebrities they admired. Sharma felt that the concept hadn't been greatly explored in cinema.

On 16 December 2013, Yash Raj Films announced the project with Shah Rukh Khan as the main lead and Maneesh Sharma as the director. The project was discussed for over a year before Khan agreed to sign the deal. On 25 March 2014, it was announced that Greg Cannom would develop the look of Khan in the film and be responsible for special make-up effects. Khan underwent 3D scanning for his look as a young boy. Though it had at one time been reported that Khan was scheduled to play a 17-year-old boy in the film, Khan later denied the claim. Khan started working on the film prior to the release of his previous venture, Happy New Year, and underwent a makeover for the film. According to Khan, Fan is a "family" film. He wanted to do an "intense yet commercially viable film".

Amid speculation, Khan confirmed the film would have two heroines, but added that the film "did not require a big female star". Model Waluscha de Sousa played an important role in the film. She was cast following an audition with Shanoo Sharma. Ileana D'Cruz, Vaani Kapoor, and Parineeti Chopra were each considered for the role before de Sousa was cast. She had previously acted with Khan in a few commercials.
It marked the debut role of Shriya Pilgaonkar, the daughter of Sachin Pilgaonkar, who had an important role in Fan. She was selected after an audition. The dialogue was written by Sharat Kataria and Habib Faisal. Manu Anand and Namrata Rao were hired as the cinematographer and editor, respectively. Parveen Shaikh and Oh Sea Young served as the film's action directors. Sayani Gupta, Deepika Amin, and Yogendra Tiku also had roles in the film. Gupta was chosen after Shanoo was impressed with her performance in Margarita with a Straw.

Filming and post-production 

Principal photography began in July 2014. The film was shot in Mumbai, Dubrovnik, London and Delhi. In October 2014, Khan reported that he had finished shooting a 20-day schedule for Fan. Parts of the film were shot outside Khan's residence in Mannat. In April 2015, Fan became the first film to shoot at the Madame Tussauds in London. Khan's statue was temporarily moved to the London Eye for filming. In February 2015, Khan was spotted shooting in the Delhi neighbourhood. Filming continued in Dubrovnik despite Khan suffering a knee injury while filming an action sequence. India Today reported that Khan was back in Mumbai in April. Khan simultaneously shot for Dilwale and Raees along with Fan.

Khan was injured again when he travelled back to Mumbai. In November, Khan revealed that the film used dialogues from his previous ventures, one being Baazigar. On 16 November 2015, Khan returned to Delhi for additional filming.
In November 2015, it was announced that the filming of the project was complete. In January 2016, the filming visual of the song "Jabra Fan" was revealed. The song was shot in the streets of Delhi.

For dubbing the role for Gaurav, Khan had to modulate his voice. Along with visual effects, prosthetics were used to make Khan seem younger. The production was made on an estimated budget of ₹850 million. Produced by Chopra under the label Yash Raj Films, which distributed the film, its final cut ran for a total of 142 minutes. The dialogues were written by Sharat Kataria, while Habib Faisal co-wrote the script with Sharma.

Music 

Fan was a songless film. A. R. Rahman was initially roped in to compose the score of the film. But due to reasons unknown, he opted out. Then, the soundtrack of Fan consisted of a marketing track that was not present in the film, which was composed by Vishal–Shekhar with lyrics written by Varun Grover. The original score was composed by Italian composer Andrea Guerra. The first song "Jabra Fan", was released as a single track on 7 February 2016. The soundtrack was released on 13 March 2016 and included 13 tracks, with one theme music and 12 songs, which were each different versions of "Jabra Fan". The song was in 9 Indian languages sung by regional singers, 2 foreign languages sung by foreign singers and a mashup version of "Jabra Fan", which is a remix version of all the 11 languages.

Marketing
Khan's house was graffiti painted as a promotional strategy.
The logo of the film, the first of its kind with a collage of pictures of Khan's real fans, was released on 23 October 2015. The makers released a 2-minute teaser for the film on Shah Rukh Khan's birthday on 2 November 2015. This was followed by the music video of the song "Jabra Fan", released on 16 February 2016 for promotional purposes. The official trailer of Fan was released on 29 February 2016 and was viewed 4 million times on the Internet in the first 24 hours. The 3-minute video later garnered over 20 million views on YouTube with more than 170 thousand likes, a record for a Bollywood film. The film's teaser was released on Khan's birthday. A game based on the film was in development in February 2016 and released in 2017. A contest titled 'Tu Nahi Samjega' was organised by Yash Raj Films.

Release
Fan was scheduled for release in late 2014 or early 2015, but owing to the injuries sustained by Khan during the filming of Happy New Year, the film's release date was postponed to 14 August 2015. The complex post-production visual-effects work further pushed the release of Fan to early 2016. After several delays, the film was released on 15 April 2016 in 3,500 screens in India and about 1,100 screens abroad.

Reception

India 
Fan received highly positive response from critics. Critics praised Khan's performance,  visual effects and action sequences while they criticised the loosely written script and editing. Raja Sen from Rediff.com gave the film 4.5 out of 5 stars and called Fan a brilliant film with Shah Rukh Khan at his best. Zee News also awarded the film 4.5 stars, saying "The movie encapsulates the fandom which SRK as a star enjoys and why his fans must watch this to understand how he achieved what he did." The Times of India rated the film 4 out of 5 and commented, "Fan is Shah Rukh Khan's triumph all the way. He pulls off a terrifically dramatic double act, altering his look, feel and intensity, but as Gaurav, Shah Rukh makes you forget everything – except feeling scared." Mid-Day also saw the film worthy of 4/5 and reviewed, "Right from the beginning of this thriller, which undoubtedly boasts of one, oops, two of his best performances, it is evident why Shah Rukh Khan is needed for a film of this sort, and why only someone in his position and with his caliber could do it too." Aditya Sinha from Asianet News called it Khan's "greatest performance" to date.

Taran Adarsh from Bollywood Hungama gave the film 3.5 stars out of 5 and opined, "On the whole, Fan has a brilliant first half, but loses track in the second hour, only to pick up again towards the pre-climax. The writing should've been tighter, but what works is the terrific act by SRK as the fan." The Hindu called the film Khan's return to form and said, "SRK couldn't have found a better vehicle than Fan, both as an actor and as a celebration of the highs and the lows of his own stardom. A stardom whose enormity he'd himself find difficult to wrap around his head." The Indian Express also gave the film 3.5 out of 5 stars and stated, "Fan is a triumph. Shah Rukh Khan is played to all his strengths, and he plays it just right, gliding in and out of the star and the fan, creating distinct identities and outlines in one scene, and blurring the lines just so in the next." Anna M. M. Vetticad of Firstpost writes, "Much of its appeal lies in the fact that the central characters are not stereotyped. Besides, when Shah Rukh Khan decides to go real and understated, it always makes for compelling viewing."

India Today gave the film 3.5 stars and commented, "Maneesh Sharma and Shah Rukh Khan hand-deliver the mindscape – of both the fan and the star – on screen. And brilliantly," but felt that unnecessary scenes could have been cut from the film. Anupama Chopra of Hindustan Times also rated it 3.5 out of 5 and said that she "can guarantee that the next time you see a horde of screaming fans, you'll observe them more keenly. You might even wonder what their stories are." NDTV Movies gave the film 3 stars out of 5 and opined, "Fan works for the most part because it has the fabulous SRK act as a 'young' star-struck boy. His energetic performance is worth the price of the ticket – if not more." Rajeev Masand of CNN-IBN gave 3 stars out of 5, commenting "As I left the cinema having watched the film, I found myself conflicted about my feelings. There is so much to admire here, but it’s evident the filmmakers think they’ve made a smarter film than they actually have. Still, Fan works for the most part. And anyone who – like me – had grown tired and disappointed with Shah Rukh's unwillingness to step out of his comfort zone will have reason to be a fan again."

Overseas 
On Rotten Tomatoes the film has a rating of 79%, based on 24 reviews, with an average rating of 6.5/10. Mark Kermode of The Guardian rates the film 4/5 and writes, "Shah Rukh Khan outdoes himself twice in this dual-role psychological thriller." Sonali Kokra of The National rates the film 3.5/5 and writes, "Just for these rare moments inspired by Shah Rukh Khan's real life, you should go and watch Fan." Manjusha Radhakrishnan of Gulf News rates the film 3/5 and opines, "It's engaging to watch a powerful actor and his seemingly powerless admirer indulge in a twisted battle of wills." Anil Sinanan of Time Out rates the film 3/5 felt, "A little more restraint in maintaining the tonal consistency would have resulted in a much darker and satisfying cautionary tale about the perils of fame and blind love." Wendy Ide of Screen International wrote, "Despite the slapdash plotting, the film – taken from the point of view of the star – gives an uneasy insight into the celebrity's co-dependent relationship with the people who make him, and can destroy him."

Lisa Tsering of The Hollywood Reporter criticised the plot and wrote, "Sharma pads out the songless film with well-executed but overlong action pieces that become even more frustrating when you consider the ways time could have been better spent exploring Aryan's fascinating backstory." Majira of Cairo 360 shared the view, writing, "[The] story could have benefitted from being a bit more restrained." J Hurtado of ScreenAnarchy wrote, "This is a mediocre film saved by the presence of its overpowered, overexposed, and overconfident star." In contrast, Itrat Syed of Georgia Straight wrote that the film is "An insightful rumination on the codependency between idols and their devotees, disguised as a psychological thriller." Prathna Sarkar of International Business Times wrote, "With Fan, SRK proves why he is considered one of the finest actors in business."

Box office 
On its opening day, Fan collected 19.20 crore in India, the fourth-highest for a Khan film at the time. Compared to the total gross of 52.35 crore collected in the first week, Fan collected only 7.75 crore in the second week, indicating a drop of 85 percent. Fans gross in India was 120 crore. However, it was successful overseas, where its gross had crossed 10 million, more than the overseas gross of Ra.One. The worldwide gross of Fan was around 188.4 crore.

Accolades 
Red Chillies VFX received the Filmfare Award for Best Special Effects at the 62nd Filmfare Awards for their work with visual effects in Fan.

Notes

References

External links 
 
 
 

2010s Hindi-language films
2016 action thriller films
2016 psychological thriller films
Indian action thriller films
Indian psychological thriller films
Films shot in London
Films shot in Delhi
Films shot in Mumbai
Films about stalking
Indian films about revenge
2016 films
Films scored by Vishal–Shekhar
Yash Raj Films films
Films set in India
Films set in Delhi
Films shot in Croatia
Films shot in Oxfordshire
Indian chase films
Films about Bollywood
Films directed by Maneesh Sharma